Gurdeep Roy (born Mohinder Purba; 1 December 1957), known professionally as Deep Roy, is a Kenyan-British actor, puppeteer, and stuntman.

Life and career
Roy was born on 1 December 1957 in Nairobi to Indian parents in a Sikh family. He studied accounting in London before dropping out at 18. He later enrolled in The Slim Wood School of Comedy and got his start in the entertainment arena in England since 1970, as a stand-up comic in local cabaret clubs. In April 1970, Roy opened on the UK stage in Ray Cooney's Miracle Worker at the Palace Theatre, Westcliff-on-Sea. He made his professional screen acting debut in a 1976 episode of The New Avengers, titled "Target!" as a character named Klokoe. He made his film debut later that same year, in The Pink Panther Strikes Again, as the Italian Assassin. Another early role was as Mr. Sin, the "pig-brained Peking Homunculus", a villain with a distinct appetite for homicide, in the Doctor Who serial The Talons of Weng-Chiang. In 1979, Roy played a genetically engineered life form "Decima" in the first season Blake's 7 episode "The Web", the diminutive chess genius, "The Klute", in the second season Blake's 7 episode "Gambit" and he voiced the character "Moloch", in the third season Blake's 7 episode "Moloch". He portrayed the Jedi Master Yoda in Star Wars: The Empire Strikes Back. He is uncredited on the film but can be seen in many behind-the-scenes photos dressed as Yoda for perspective shots filmed towards the end of production.

He has played apes in two movies: Greystoke: The Legend of Tarzan, Lord of the Apes and again in the Tim Burton remake of Planet of the Apes (2001) in two roles, one as a young gorilla boy and as Thade's niece. He has worked for Burton in three other films, Big Fish (2003), Corpse Bride (2005), where he supplied General Bonesapart's voice, and Charlie and the Chocolate Factory (also 2005). He played all the Oompa-Loompas (165 of them) in Charlie and the Chocolate Factory. In referencing his workload during production, director Tim Burton called Roy the "hardest-working man in show biz." Roy had extensive training for the role in dance, yoga, and some minor instrument playing.

He has performed many other roles in films and on television, including The X-Files, Flash Gordon, Return to Oz (as the Tin Woodman), Jim Henson's The Dark Crystal as a puppeteer extra, The NeverEnding Story as Teeny Weeny, the rider of the "racing snail", Alien from L.A., Howling VI: The Freaks as Mr Toones and Return of the Jedi as Droopy McCool.

He appeared in Transformers: Revenge of the Fallen (2009) as an Egyptian border guard and in the film Star Trek (also 2009) as Keenser, Scotty's assistant on the ice planet Delta Vega; he reprised the Keenser role in the sequels Star Trek Into Darkness and Star Trek Beyond. In one of his more prominent speaking roles, Roy played Aaron, a violent Mumbai-born Mexican criminal in second season of the HBO comedy Eastbound & Down. Roy starred as Sandeep Majumdar in the 2012 short film The Ballad of Sandeep.

Filmography

Film

Television

Music videos

References

External links

1957 births
Living people
20th-century British male actors
20th-century Kenyan male actors
21st-century British male actors
21st-century Kenyan male actors
Actors with dwarfism
British male actors
British people of Indian descent
British stunt performers
Kenyan emigrants to the United Kingdom
Kenyan male film actors
Kenyan people of Indian descent
Kenyan stunt performers
People from Nairobi
Puppeteers